2019 Indonesia Pro Futsal League will be twelfth season of Indonesia Pro Futsal League that organized by Indonesian Futsal Federation, as well as the fourth season of the futsal competition under the name "Pro Futsal League". Sixteen Indonesian futsal clubs will compete for this competition, with four clubs from the 2018 Nusantara Futsal League semi-finalists. Vamos Mataram are the defending champions from the last season. This season will start from 8 December 2018 until the final stage on 31 March 2019.

Teams 
There are 16 futsal teams that will be competing in this season.

Group A

Group B

Schedules and venues 

Eight venues in eight cities in Indonesia will host 2019 Indonesia Pro Futsal League from the group stage. Group stage will be held from 8 December 2018 until 24 March 2019, meanwhile the knockout stage will be held on 6 and 7 April 2019.

Meanwhile, the schedule of the Indonesia Pro Futsal League 2019 group stage is as follows below.

Group stage

Group A

Group B

Final Four stage 
Final Four stage will be played on 30 and 31 March 2019.
 All matches will be played ini TBA.
 All times listed are UTC+7

Semi-finals

Third place match

Final

References

External links
Official Website

Futsal leagues in Indonesia
2019 in Indonesian sport
2018 in futsal